Zablocki or Zabłocki is a surname of Polish origin, that may refer to:

Benjamin Zablocki (1941–2020), American sociologist
Bernard Zabłocki (1907–2002), Polish scientist
Clement J. Zablocki (1912–1983), American politician from Wisconsin

Courtney Zablocki (born 1981), American athlete
Franciszek Zabłocki (1754–1821), Polish writer
Jakub Zabłocki (1984–2015), Polish football player
Jan Zabłocki ( – ?), Polish major
Janusz Zabłocki (1926–2014), Polish politician
Olivier Zablocki (born 1986), Belgian virologist
Wojciech Zabłocki (1930–2020), Polish athlete and architect

See also
Zabłocki, a Polish aristocratic family
Zablocki v. Redhail (1978), a U.S. Supreme Court case

Polish-language surnames